Dipsadoboa is a genus of snakes in the family Colubridae.

Geographic range
The genus Dipsadoboa is endemic to Africa.

Species
The following 12 species are recognized as being valid.
Dipsadoboa aulica (Günther, 1864)
Dipsadoboa brevirostris (Sternfeld, 1908)
Dipsadoboa duchesnii (Boulenger, 1901)
Dipsadoboa flavida (Broadley & R. Stevens, 1971)
Dipsadoboa kageleri (Uthmöller, 1939)
Dipsadoboa montisilva Branch, Conradie, & Tolley, 2019
Dipsadoboa shrevei (Loveridge, 1932)
Dipsadoboa underwoodi Rasmussen, 1993
Dipsadoboa unicolor Günther, 1858
Dipsadoboa viridis (W. Peters, 1869)
Dipsadoboa weileri (Lindholm, 1905)
Dipsadoboa werneri (Boulenger, 1897)

Nota bene: A binomial authority in parentheses indicates that the species was originally described in a genus other than Dipsadoboa.

References

Further reading
Günther A (1858). Catalogue of Colubrine Snakes in the Collection of the British Museum. London: Trustees of the British Museum. (Taylor and Francis, printers). xvi + 281 pp. (Dipsadoboa, new genus, p. 182).

Dipsadoboa
Snake genera
Taxa named by Albert Günther